Dean Lorey (born November 17, 1967) is an American writer and producer whose projects include films such as Major Payne and Animal Crackers, and television series which include My Wife and Kids, Arrested Development, The Crazy Ones, Those Who Can't, Powerless and iZombie. He is the author of a children's book series entitled Nightmare Academy.

Biography
Lorey grew up in Conyers, Georgia before attending New York University's film school, where he wrote book cover copy for Simon & Schuster and Bantam as well as writing commercials for MTV and Nickelodeon. In 1990. He moved to California and wrote a script for the movie that would become My Boyfriend's Back, collaborating with Adam Marcus and Sean S. Cunningham. Afterward, Sean asked him to finish the screenplay for Jason Goes to Hell: The Final Friday, in which he also had a cameo appearance. From there, he continued to write screenplays for movies as well as working on writing, directing, and producing for television.

Works

Film

Television
 1997-1998 413 Hope St.
 2001–2005 My Wife and Kids 
 2006, 2013 Arrested Development
 2013-2014 The Crazy Ones
 2016 Those Who Can't
 2017 Powerless
 2018 iZombie
 2019-2020 Harley Quinn
2021 Big Shot

Book
 2007 Nightmare Academy: Monster Hunters
 2008 Nightmare Academy: Charlie's Monsters (The UK edition of Monster Hunters)
 2008 Nightmare Academy: Monster Madness
 2009 Nightmare Academy: Monster Revenge also known as Nightmare Academy: Monster War

Personal life
Dean Lorey currently lives in Calabasas, California, with his wife, Elizabeth, and their sons, Chris and Alex. His first book came out on August 21, 2007. Universal has purchased the film rights to the book and the producers will be Stephen Sommers and Bob Ducsay, who worked on movies such as The Mummy.

References

External links
Dean Lorey Official Website

Harper Collins Nightmare Academy Website

1967 births
American male film actors
21st-century American novelists
American male novelists
American male screenwriters
American television directors
Television producers from California
American television writers
Living people
Tisch School of the Arts alumni
People from Calabasas, California
Novelists from Georgia (U.S. state)
American male television writers
Screenwriters from California
21st-century American male writers